Since the original Friday the 13th film in 1980 there has been a myriad of media releases from the franchise, ranging from films, novels, comics, albums and a television series.

Films

Featurettes

Shorts

TV series

Novels

Video games

Comics

Albums

References 

 
Friday the 13th
Friday the 13th (franchise) lists